Elections to South Lanarkshire Council took place on 3 May 2007 on the same day as the 31 other Scottish local government elections.

The election was the first to use the 20 new wards created as a result of the Local Governance (Scotland) Act 2004, each ward electing three or four councillors using the single transferable vote system form of proportional representation. The new wards replaced the 67 single-member wards which used the plurality (first past the post) system of election.

Labour retained their position as the largest party on the council but were no longer in overall control after the introduction of proportional voting saw them lose 22 seats. The Scottish National Party (SNP) recorded their best result in a South Lanarkshire election as they gained 17 seats to remain the second-largest party. The Conservatives also made gains to hold eight seats. The number of independent candidates elected with remained at three and the number of Liberal Democrats remained at two.

Election results

Source:

Note: Votes are the sum of first preference votes across all council wards. The net gain/loss and percentage changes relate to the result of the previous Scottish local elections on 1 May 2003. This is because STV has an element of proportionality which is not present unless multiple seats are being elected. This may differ from other published sources showing gain/loss relative to seats held at the dissolution of Scotland's councils. This was the first election to use the STV electoral system so only net gains/losses are shown.

Ward results

Clydesdale West

Clydesdale North

Clydesdale East

Clydesdale South

Avondale and Stonehouse

East Kilbride South

East Kilbride Central South

East Kilbride Central North

East Kilbride West

East Kilbride East

Rutherglen South

Rutherglen Central and North

Cambuslang West

Cambuslang East

Blantyre

Bothwell and Uddingston

Hamilton North and East

Hamilton West and Earnock

Hamilton South

Larkhall

By-elections

Cambuslang East
Cambuslang East councillor John Higgins died on 29 December 2007. A by-election, held on 6 March 2008, was won by Labour's Richard Tullett.

East Kilbride West
Labour's Alan Scott won a by-election in East Kilbride West on 28 October 2010 to fill the vacancy which arose with the election of Michael McCann as an MP.

Hamilton West and Earnock
The SNP's John Menzies won a by-election in Hamilton West and Earnock on 8 December 2011 to fill the vacancy which arose with the death of Independent Tommy Gilligan on 22 October 2011.

Notes

References

2007 Scottish local elections
2007
21st century in South Lanarkshire